COASTMAP is a mnemonic acronym to remember key questions for a person's psychiatric history. The mnemonic is often used in the field of emergency medicine by paramedics during the secondary assessment.

Meaning
The parts of the mnemonic are:

See also
OPQRST
SOAP
SAMPLE

References

Medical mnemonics
Mnemonic acronyms
Psychiatric assessment